The 2019 Da Nang Tennis Open was a professional tennis tournament played on hard courts. It was the first edition of the tournament which was part of the 2019 ATP Challenger Tour. It took place in Da Nang, Vietnam between 6 and 12 January 2019.

Singles main draw entrants

Seeds

 1 Rankings are as of December 31, 2018.

Other entrants
The following players received entry into the singles main draw as wildcards:
  Shinji Hazawa
  Daniel Nguyen
  Sonchat Ratiwatana
  Trịnh Linh Giang
  Stefan Vujic

The following players received entry into the singles main draw using their ITF World Tennis Ranking:
  Riccardo Bonadio
  Kim Cheong-eui
  Jordi Samper Montaña
  Yuta Shimizu

The following players received entry from the qualifying draw:
  Manish Sureshkumar
  Kaito Uesugi

The following player received entry as a lucky loser:
  Alafia Ayeni

Champions

Singles

 Marcel Granollers def.  Matteo Viola 6–2, 6–0.

Doubles

 Hsieh Cheng-peng /  Christopher Rungkat def.  Leander Paes /  Miguel Ángel Reyes-Varela 6–3, 2–6, [11–9].

References

Da Nang Tennis Open
2019 in Vietnamese sport
January 2019 sports events in Asia